Palumbia pendleburyi is a species of hoverfly in the family Syrphidae.

Distribution
Borneo.

References

Eristalinae
Insects described in 1931
Diptera of Asia
Taxa named by Charles Howard Curran